The Razlovtsi insurrection (Razlovsko vastanie; , Razlovechko vostanie) was a Bulgarian rebellion in the areas of  Maleshevo and Piyanets in Ottoman Bulgaria, part of the April Uprising of 1876.

The work on its preparation began in late 1875 in Thessaloniki. A revolutionary group was created there, that took a decision to organize an anti-Ottoman insurrection. Basically, this group consisted of activists of the Association "Bulgarian Dawn" (Българска зора). The leader of the group was Dimitar Popgeorgiev. The preparations for the rebellion began in late 1875 in the village of Razlovtsi, guided by Dimitar Berovski and Stoyan Razlovski. Nedelya Petkova and her daughter sewed the flag of the uprising. It was planned that the rebellion would cover Maleshevo, Radovish, Strumitsa, Petrich, Melnik and later the Osogovo. After the outbreak of the April Uprising, a number of arrests were made by the Ottoman authorities in late April 1876. Because of this, the revolt broke out prematurely on May 7 (May 19 in Gregorian), in Raslovtsi. Two revolutionary bands of about 60 people got the village for a short time, and then the rebellion spread in Maleshevo and Piyanets. However, the revolt was suppressed, and many of the rebels were killed or arrested. The survivors escaped into the Maleshevo Mountains, but no further action was possible.

See also
 Constantinople Conference
 April Uprising

References

Bulgarian rebellions
Rebellions against the Ottoman Empire
19th-century rebellions
1876 in Bulgaria
1876 in the Ottoman Empire
Ottoman period in the history of Bulgaria
Conflicts in 1876
Macedonia under the Ottoman Empire
Great Eastern Crisis